ZerNona Stewart Black (1906–2005) was the wife of civil rights leader, the Rev. Claude Black.

She was an instructor at Langston University in Oklahoma  and at St. Philip's College in San Antonio.

In 1943, she accepted a three-month transfer to the San Antonio YWCA-USO for Black Military, a group formed to help morale for African American service members and their families.

During the 1950s and 1960s, Black served alongside her husband in the Civil Rights Movement. Black had also founded several senior citizen daycare centers such as Health Incorporated, which earned her recognition from the nation's capital.

Family
In 1946, ZerNona Stewart married Claude Black; they had two children, six grandchildren and nine greatgrandchildren.

Death
In January 2005, Black died peacefully in her sleep, aged 98, two weeks short of her 59th wedding anniversary. She is interred in Meadowlawn Memorial Park in San Antonio, Texas.

Legacy
The city of San Antonio has created The Rev. Claude and ZerNona Black Scholarship Endowment Fund.

Trivia
 Per the Woodson Family Tree, she was a descendant of President Thomas Jefferson and his slave Sally Hemings.
 She was a member of Alpha Kappa Alpha, a noted African-American women's sorority.

External links
Claude & ZerNona Black Foundation
Obituary
Claude and ZerNona Black Scholarship
Texas House of Rep Resolution
Woodson Family Tree

1906 births
2005 deaths
African-American academics
Langston University faculty
Baptists from Texas
People from Muskogee, Oklahoma
People from San Antonio
Academics from Oklahoma
Academics from Texas
Baptists from Oklahoma
20th-century Baptists
20th-century African-American people
21st-century African-American people